Demansia is a genus of venomous snakes of the family Elapidae. Members of the genus are commonly known as whip snakes or whipsnakes, as are members of several other genera.

Description
All species of the genus Demansia are gray, brown, gray-green, or beige, save for Demansia psammophis (yellow-faced whip snake), which may be cream-coloured.  Whip snakes are long and slender.  They have large eyes and relatively small heads that are only slightly wider than their bodies. All species in the genus Demansia are venomous.

Distribution
Whip snakes of the genus Demansia are found in Australia, Papua New Guinea in the area around Port Moresby, and nearby islands.

Diet
Demansia whip snakes eat mainly lizards. These whipsnakes are diurnal (active in the day), and use their keen eyesight to hunt.  The prey dies quickly from the effects of the snake's venom.

Interaction with humans
In 2007 a man died after being bitten by a whip snake in Victoria. Their bites are generally regarded as akin to a bee sting and relatively harmless, but the man became woozy and went into cardiac arrest before paramedics arrived.

Species
The following 14 species are recognized as being valid.
Demansia angusticeps  - narrow-headed whipsnake 
Demansia calodera  - black-necked whipsnake 
Demansia flagellatio  - long-tailed whipsnake
Demansia olivacea  - olive whipsnake 
Demansia papuensis  - greater black whipsnake
Demansia psammophis  - yellow-faced whipsnake
Demansia quaesitor  - sombre whipsnake
Demansia reticulata  - reticulated whipsnake 
Demansia rimicola  - soil-crack whipsnake
Demansia rufescens  - rufous whip snake
Demansia shinei  - Shine's whipsnake
Demansia simplex  - grey whipsnake
Demansia torquata  - collared whipsnake
Demansia vestigiata  - lesser black whipsnake 

Nota bene: A binomial authority in parentheses indicates that the species was originally described in a genus other than Demansia.

See also
Whip snake (disambiguation)

References

Further reading
Gray JE (1842). "Description of some hitherto unrecorded species of Australian Reptiles and Batrachians". Zoological Miscellany 2: 51-57. (Demansia, new genus, p. 54). 

 
Snake genera
Taxa named by John Edward Gray